The decimetre, or decimeter (American spelling) (SI symbol dm), is a unit of length in the International System of Units, equal to one tenth of a metre, ten centimetres, one hundred millimetres, and 3.937 inches.

The common non-SI metric unit of volume, the litre, is defined as one cubic decimetre, although, from 1901 to 1964, there was a slight difference between the two due to the litre being defined using the kilogram rather than the metre.

See also
Metric prefix
Deci-

Conversion of units, for comparison with other units of length.

References

Metre
-01